Jhon Edwar Valoy Riascos (born 26 July 1991) is a Colombian former footballer.

Career statistics

Club

Notes

References

1991 births
Living people
Colombian footballers
Association football midfielders
Categoría Primera A players
China League One players
Centauros Villavicencio footballers
Deportes Quindío footballers
Atlético Nacional footballers
Once Caldas footballers
Hunan Billows F.C. players
Colombian expatriate footballers
Colombian expatriate sportspeople in China
Expatriate footballers in China
Colombian expatriate sportspeople in El Salvador
Expatriate footballers in El Salvador
Footballers from Cali